Mosenergo (also known as TGK-3;) is a Russian power generating company operating on fossil fuel and a large thermal generation. In addition to electric power it also generates and sells heat for consumers in Moscow and the Moscow Oblast. The company was founded in 1887 in Moscow.

The power plants of Mosenergo have installed electricity capacity of 11,100 MW and thermal capacity of 39,900 MW. Mosenergo operates 17 power plants with 104 cogeneration turbines, 7 gas-turbine units, one combined cycle power unit, two expansion generation units, 117 power boilers, and 114 peak-load boilers. Mosenergo is a subsidiary of Gazprom. Its shares are listed on the Moscow Exchange and London Stock Exchange.

References

External links 

 

Electric power companies of Russia
Companies listed on the Moscow Exchange
Gazprom subsidiaries
Companies based in Moscow
Russian brands